Kotroni is a neighbourhood in the city of Patras, Achaea, Greece. 

In ancient times, the city of Pefnos was located about five miles seawards west of the settlement.

References 

Neighborhoods in Patras